Jacqueline Alexandre (born 1942) is a French journalist and television host.

She presented Soir 3 on France 3 from 1987 to 1989. She is an avid collector of stamps from the early Victorian era.

References

External links

1942 births
Living people
French television presenters
French journalists
French women television presenters
French women journalists